Mary Winifred Harris  was the thirteenth Clerk of the New Zealand House of Representatives ("Clerk of the House"). She was appointed Clerk of the House on 10 December 2007, following the resignation of David Graham McGee. She served as Clerk of the House for 7 years and 7 months before retiring on 5 July 2015. 

Mary Harris began her state sector career in 1979 when she was appointed to the Department of Statistics as an Assistant Investigating Officer. After promotion to the position of Senior Survey Officer, she was involved in the development and running of the Household Labour Force Survey. 

On 22 June 1987 she joined the Parliamentary Service (which from 1985 to 1988 had oversight of the Office of the Clerk of the House) as a Senior Committee Secretary and in 1990 was promoted to the senior management role of Clerk-Assistant, initially with responsibility for providing services to Select Committees and, from July 2000, managing Reporting Services (including Hansard, broadcasting and te reo Māori interpretation). She was appointed to the office of Deputy Clerk on 11 February 2002, and in 2007 she became the first woman to be appointed Clerk of the New Zealand House of Representatives.

Mary Harris has a Bachelor of Arts degree, with majors in both Music and Geography, from the  Victoria University of Wellington. In the 2014 New Year Honours, she was appointed a Companion of the Queen's Service Order in recognition of her services to Parliament.

References

Year of birth missing (living people)
Living people
Clerks of the New Zealand House of Representatives
Companions of the Queen's Service Order